Charles Clement Coe (1830-1921) was an English Unitarian minister and writer.

Coe was born in King's Lynn and educated at Manchester College, Oxford. He was President of the Leicester Literary and Philosophical Society (1862-1863) and was Minister of the Unitarian Great Meeting chapel in Bond Street, Leicester. His was minister at Bank Street Unitarian Chapel in Bolton, Lancashire, from 1874 to 1895, when he moved to Bournemouth.

It was while at Bolton that Coe wrote a large volume, Nature Versus Natural Selection: An Essay on Organic Evolution (1895). He defended evolution but rejected natural selection. The biologist J. Arthur Thomson gave the book a positive review, commenting that it is a very interesting critique of natural selection written with much skill.

Publications
Nature Versus Natural Selection: An Essay on Organic Evolution (1895)

Notes

External links
 

1830 births
1921 deaths
English Unitarian ministers
People from King's Lynn
19th-century English clergy
20th-century English clergy
Alumni of Harris Manchester College, Oxford